"Ghost Showers" is the second single from the album Bulletproof Wallets by Ghostface Killah.

The song was later added to his greatest hits album Shaolin's Finest.

The song is largely an interpolation of Dr. Buzzard's Original Savannah Band's single "Sunshower".

Lyrical content
Despite an obvious attempt at a club hit, Ghost was praised for his strong lyrical content.

Charts

References

2001 singles
Ghostface Killah songs
2001 songs
Epic Records singles
Songs written by Biz Markie
Songs written by Marley Marl
Songs written by Ghostface Killah
Songs written by August Darnell